General elections were held in Suriname on 25 May 2000. The result was a victory for the New Front for Democracy and Development, which won 33 of the 51 seats. Voter turnout was 72%.

Results

References

Suriname
Elections in Suriname
2000 in Suriname
Election